Glycobius speciosus is a species of beetle in the family Cerambycidae, the only species in the genus Glycobius, known commonly as the sugar maple borer, as the larvae feed on sugar maple (Acer saccharum).

References

Clytini
Monotypic Cerambycidae genera